Stephen Turk (9 January 1948 - 25 August 2005) is a former Scotland international rugby union player.

Rugby Union career

Amateur career

He played for Langholm.

He joined the Army, and played for Army Rugby Union; and stationed at Catterick then turned out for Harrogate.

Provincial career

He played for South of Scotland District as a full back in all three matches of their 1970–71 Scottish Inter-District Championship season campaign. The South won every match and finished that season as champions, with Turk the top scorer for the season with 24 points.

On moving to Catterick with the army, he then played for Yorkshire county.

International career

He was capped by Scotland just the once, against England in 1971, coming on as a replacement at Centre. Scotland won the match, their first win at Twickenham since 1938.

Death

Turk died on the 25 August 2005 after a long illness.

References

1948 births
Scottish rugby union players
Rugby union centres
Scotland international rugby union players
Langholm RFC players
South of Scotland District (rugby union) players
Harrogate RFC players
Yorkshire County RFU players
Army rugby union players